Janet Rae Johnson Mondlane is an American-born Mozambican activist. Together with her husband, Eduardo Chivambo Mondlane, she founded Frelimo and helped organize the liberation of Mozambique from the Portuguese colonialists.

Janet Rae Johnson was born in 1934 in Illinois, and was raised in a middle-upper class American family.  In 1951 at the age of 17, she attended a church camp in Geneva, Wisconsin where she met the 31 year old Eduardo Mondlane, who was giving a speech about the future of Africa.  In 1956, five years later, they married after she received her B.A. and he his M.A.  At the time of their marriage, Janet was 22 and Eduardo was 36. They later had three children, Eduardo, Jr., Chude, and Nyeleti.

In 1963 the Mondlanes moved with their family to Dar es Salaam, Tanzania in order to organize the liberation factions fighting the Portuguese in Mozambique.  Together they helped form Frelimo, and Mondlane was the director of the Mozambique Institute, the nonmilitary branch of Frelimo. The Institute organized health care and secondary education and raised funds for scholarships abroad for Mozambicans.

After independence in 1975 she held positions within the Mozambican government, and was general secretary of the National AIDS council from 2000 to 2003. She established the Eduardo Chivambo Mondlane Foundation in 1996.

In 2011 she received an honorary doctorate in Education Sciences from Universidade Eduardo Mondlane in Maputo, Mozambique.

References

1934 births
Living people
American emigrants to Mozambique
American expatriates in Tanzania
FRELIMO politicians
Mozambican independence activists
Mozambican politicians
Mozambican people of American descent
Naturalized citizens of Mozambique
People from Illinois